The  St. Louis Gateway Film Critics Association Award for Best Documentary Film is an award given by the St. Louis Gateway Film Critics Association, honoring the finest achievements in documentary filmmaking.

Winners

2000s

2010s

References 

Lists of films by award
Documentary
American documentary film awards